William Montgomery Cole was an Irish Anglican priest.

Cole was educated at Trinity College, Dublin. He was Dean of Waterford from July 1804 until his death in October that year.

He was the third son of William Cole, 1st Earl of Enniskillen.

References

Alumni of Trinity College Dublin
Irish Anglicans
Deans of Waterford
1804 deaths
Year of birth missing
Cole family (Anglo-Irish aristocracy)
Younger sons of earls